Talk to the Press is a press and publicity agency that was founded in 2007 by media expert and former national newspaper journalist Natasha Courtenay-Smith. The company provides an outlet for individuals who wish to sell their stories and specialises in feature stories of a personal nature that range from dealing with the credit crunch to teen prostitution.

Coverage
Their articles predominantly appear in tabloid newspapers including The Daily Mail, The Sun and The Daily Mirror, and in women's magazines such as Closer, Reveal, Bella and Take a Break. In March 2010 Talk to the Press featured in the Cutting Edge documentary My Daughter Grew Another Head about women's magazines.

Articles about Talk to the Press have appeared in the Guardian and Independent newspapers. The journalists' newspaper The Press Gazette describes Talk to the Press as a website which aims to bridge the gap between the media and individuals with a story to tell.

References

External links
Talk to the Press Site

Press release agencies
News agencies based in the United Kingdom